Elaine Vassie (born 10 October 1981 in Paisley, Scotland) is a professional rugby union coach. She is the assistant general manager and attack coach of Major League Rugby side Dallas Jackals. 

Vassie caught the headlines in 2009, taking over then National League 1 side Manchester Rugby Club in a role that had been labelled "arguably the hardest job in rugby".  Aged just 28,  no other female had or has since held such a position at National League level. Following her 3-year spell at Manchester Rugby Club, Vassie linked up with Italian side, DAK Mantova combining a coaching and club development position.  In October 2013, it was  announced that she was to become Director of Rugby of American side Griffins Rugby, the first person in such a role in the club's history.

In 2016, Vassie was announced as coach of  Women's 7's team ahead of their upcoming European Championships.

Returning to the U.S. in 2018, she was appointed as Division 1 side Dallas Harlequins' new director of rugby  and Men's Head Coach. 

Subsequently, in June 2020 Vassie was announced as attack coach and assistant general manager for the new Major League Rugby franchise Dallas Jackals, the first female AGM appointment in the league's history.

References 

1981 births
Living people
Rugby union coaches
Scottish rugby union coaches
Female sports coaches
Female rugby union coaches
Scottish female rugby union players
People from Paisley, Renfrewshire